Miana is a large village in Ahal Province, Turkmenistan, not far from the Iranian border. The eleventh century Abu Said Meikhene Mausoleum, dedicated to Abū-Sa'īd Abul-Khayr lies to the northwest.

Geography
The village is accessed via a road from the M37 highway at Dushak in the northwest, south of Tejen. The Iranian border villages of Qaratigan and Sanganeh lie to the southwest on the mountainous border. The land immediately to the north of the village is fertile, with fields under cultivation.

Landmarks
The eleventh century Abu Said Meikhene Mausoleum lies to the northwest.

Two important Neolithic and Chalcolithic period settlements have been excavated in the area of Miana. 

Altyn Depe (3200 to 2400 BCE), a Neolithic settlement extending into the Bronze Age, was discovered by Boris Kuftin near the village.

Monjukli Depe, starting about 6200 BC, was discovered more recently, in 1959.

References

Populated places in Ahal Region